Sinofsky is a surname. Notable people with the surname include:

 Bruce Sinofsky (1956–2015), American documentary film director
 Steven Sinofsky (born 1965), American business executive